Anne Andrieux (born ) was a French female volleyball player, playing as an outside hitter. She was part of the France women's national volleyball team.

She competed at the 2001 European Championships.
On club level she played for USSP Albi in 2005.

References

External links
http://www.cev.lu/Competition-Area/PlayerDetails.aspx?TeamID=5520&PlayerID=20627&ID=51
http://www.ladepeche.fr/article/2007/03/08/394075-volley-ball-anne-andrieux-j-arrete-l-equipe-de-france.html

1979 births
Living people
French women's volleyball players
People from Lens, Pas-de-Calais
Sportspeople from Pas-de-Calais